The Audience Award is an annual award given by the Whistler Film Festival to the film voted most popular with audiences.

Winners

References

External links

Canadian film awards
Whistler Film Festival